The Church of Jesus Christ of Latter-day Saints, informally known as the LDS Church or Mormon Church, is a nontrinitarian Christian church that considers itself to be the restoration of the original church founded by Jesus Christ. The church is headquartered in the United States in Salt Lake City, Utah, and has established congregations and built temples worldwide. According to the church, it has over 16.8 million members and 54,539 full-time volunteer missionaries. Based on these numbers, the church is the fourth-largest Christian denomination in the United States as of 2012, and reported over 6.7 million US members . It is the largest denomination in the Latter Day Saint movement founded by Joseph Smith during the early 19th-century period of religious revival known as the Second Great Awakening.

Church theology includes the Christian doctrine of salvation only through Jesus Christ, and his substitutionary atonement on behalf of mankind. The church has an open canon of four scriptural texts: the Bible, the Book of Mormon, the Doctrine and Covenants, and the Pearl of Great Price. Other than the Bible, the majority of the church canon consists of material the church's members believe to have been revealed by God to Joseph Smith, including commentary and exegesis about the Bible, texts described as lost parts of the Bible, and other works believed to be written by ancient prophets, including the Book of Mormon. Because of doctrinal differences, Catholic, Orthodox and many Protestant churches consider the church to be distinct and separate from mainstream Christianity.

Latter-day Saints believe that the church president is a modern-day "prophet, seer, and revelator" and that Jesus Christ, under the direction of God the Father, leads the church by revealing his will and delegating his priesthood keys to its president. The president heads a hierarchical structure descending from areas to stakes and wards. Bishops, drawn from the laity, lead the wards. Male members may be ordained to the priesthood, provided they are living the standards of the church. Women are not ordained to the priesthood, but occupy leadership roles in some church organizations.

Both men and women may serve as missionaries. The church maintains a large missionary program that proselytizes and conducts humanitarian services worldwide. The LDS Church also funds and participates in humanitarian projects independent of its missionary efforts. Faithful members adhere to church laws of sexual purity, health, fasting, and Sabbath observance, and contribute ten percent of their income to the church in tithing. The church teaches sacred ordinances through which adherents make covenants with God, including baptism, confirmation, the sacrament, priesthood ordination, endowment and celestial marriage.

The church has been criticized throughout its history. Modern criticisms include disputed factual claims, treatment of minorities, and financial controversies. The church's practice of polygamy (plural marriage) was controversial until it was officially rescinded in 1890.

History

The history of the church is typically divided into three broad time periods: (1) the early history during the lifetime of Joseph Smith, which is in common with all churches associated with the Latter Day Saint movement, (2) a pioneer era under the leadership of Brigham Young and his 19th-century successors, and (3) a modern era beginning around the turn of the 20th century as Utah achieved statehood.

Beginnings

Joseph Smith formally organized the church as the Church of Christ, on April 6, 1830, in western New York. Smith later changed the name to the Church of Jesus Christ of Latter Day Saints after he stated he had received a revelation to do so. Initial converts were drawn to the church in part because of the newly published Book of Mormon, a self-described chronicle of indigenous American prophets that Smith said he had translated from golden plates.

Smith intended to establish the New Jerusalem in North America, called Zion. In 1831, the church moved to Kirtland, Ohio, and began establishing an outpost in Jackson County, Missouri, where Smith planned to eventually move the church headquarters. However, in 1833, Missouri settlers violently expelled the Latter Day Saints from Jackson County. The church attempted to recover the land through a paramilitary expedition, but did not succeed. Nevertheless, the church flourished in Kirtland as Smith published new revelations and the church built the Kirtland Temple, culminating in a dedication of the building similar to the day of Pentecost. The Kirtland era ended in 1838, after a financial scandal rocked the church and caused widespread defections. Smith regrouped with the remaining church in Far West, Missouri, but tensions soon escalated into violent conflicts with the old Missouri settlers. Believing the Latter Day Saints to be in insurrection, the Missouri governor ordered that they be "exterminated or driven from the State". In 1839, the Saints converted a swampland on the banks of the Mississippi River into Nauvoo, Illinois, which became the church's new headquarters.

Nauvoo grew rapidly as missionaries sent to Europe and elsewhere gained new converts who then flooded into Nauvoo. Meanwhile, Smith introduced polygamy to his closest associates. He also established ceremonies, which he stated the Lord had revealed to him, to allow righteous people to become gods in the afterlife, and a secular institution to govern the Millennial kingdom. He also introduced the church to a full accounting of his First Vision, in which two heavenly "personages" appeared to him at age 14. This vision would come to be regarded by the LDS Church as the most important event in human history since the resurrection of Jesus. Members believe Joseph Smith is the first modern-day prophet.

On June 27, 1844, Smith and his brother, Hyrum, were killed by a mob in Carthage, Illinois, while being held on charges of treason. Because Hyrum was Joseph's designated successor, their deaths caused a succession crisis, and Brigham Young assumed leadership over a majority of the church's membership. Young had been a close associate of Smith's and was the senior apostle of the Quorum of the Twelve.

Other splinter groups followed other leaders around this time.  These groups have no affiliation with the LDS Church, however they share a common heritage in their early church history. Collectively, they are called the Latter Day Saint movement. The largest of these smaller groups is the Community of Christ, based in Independence, Missouri, followed by the Church of Jesus Christ, based in Monongahela, Pennsylvania. Like the LDS Church, these faiths believe in Joseph Smith as a prophet and founder of their religion. They also accept the Book of Mormon, and most accept at least some version of the Doctrine and Covenants. However, they tend to disagree to varying degrees with the LDS Church concerning doctrine and church leadership.

Pioneer era

For two years after Smith's death, conflicts escalated between Mormons and other Illinois residents. Brigham Young led his followers, later called the Mormon pioneers, westward to Nebraska and then in 1847 on to what later became the Utah Territory, which at the time had been part of the indigenous lands of the Ute, Goshute, and Shoshone nations, and claimed by Mexico until 1848. Over the course of many years, over 60,000 settlers arrived, who then branched out and colonized a large region now known as the Mormon Corridor.

Young incorporated the LDS Church as a legal entity, and initially governed both the church and the state as a theocratic leader. He also publicized the practice of plural marriage in 1852. Modern research suggests that around 20 percent of Mormon families may have participated in the practice.

By 1857, tensions had again escalated between Mormons and other Americans, largely as a result of accusations involving polygamy and the theocratic rule of the Utah Territory by Young. The Utah Mormon War ensued from 1857 to 1858, which resulted in the relatively peaceful invasion of Utah by the United States Army. The most notable instance of violence during this conflict was the Mountain Meadows massacre, in which leaders of a local Mormon militia ordered the massacre of a civilian emigrant party who was traveling through Utah during the escalating military tensions. After the massacre was discovered, the church became the target of significant media criticism for it.

After the Army withdrew, Young agreed to step down from power and be replaced by a non-Mormon territorial governor, Alfred Cumming. Nevertheless, the LDS Church still wielded significant political power in the Utah Territory. Coterminously, tensions between Mormon settlers and indigenous tribes continued to escalate as settlers began colonizing a growing area of tribal lands. While Mormons and indigenous peoples made attempts at peaceful coexistence, skirmishes ensued from about 1849 to 1873 culminating in the armed conflicts of Walkara's War, the Bear River Massacre, and the Black Hawk War.

After Young's death in 1877, he was followed by other church presidents, who resisted efforts by the United States Congress to outlaw Mormon polygamous marriages. In 1878, the United States Supreme Court, in Reynolds v. United States, decreed that "religious duty" to engage in plural marriage was not a valid defense to prosecutions for violating state laws against polygamy. Conflict between Mormons and the U.S. government escalated to the point that, in 1890, Congress disincorporated the LDS Church and seized most of its assets. Soon thereafter, church president Wilford Woodruff issued a manifesto that officially suspended the performance of new polygamous marriages in the United States. Relations with the United States markedly improved after 1890, such that Utah was admitted as a U.S. state in 1896. Relations further improved after 1904, when church president Joseph F. Smith again disavowed polygamy before the United States Congress and issued a "Second Manifesto", calling for all plural marriages in the church to cease. Eventually, the church adopted a policy of excommunicating its members found practicing polygamy. Some fundamentalist groups with relatively small memberships have broken off and continue to practice polygamy, but the Church distances itself from them.

Modern times

During the 20th century, the church grew substantially and became an international organization. In 2000, the church reported 60,784 missionaries and global church membership stood at just over 11 million. Nominal worldwide membership surpassed 16 million in 2018. Slightly under half of church membership lives within the United States.

The church has become a strong proponent of the nuclear family and at times played a prominent role in political matters, including opposition to MX Peacekeeper missile bases in Utah and Nevada, the Equal Rights Amendment, legalized gambling, same-sex marriage, and physician-assisted death.

A number of official changes have taken place to the organization during the modern era. In 1978, the church reversed its previous policy of excluding black men of African descent from the priesthood, which had been in place since 1852; members of all races can now be ordained to the priesthood. Also, since the early 1900s, the church has instituted a Priesthood Correlation Program to centralize church operations and bring them under a hierarchy of priesthood leaders. During the Great Depression, the church also began operating a church welfare system, and it has conducted humanitarian efforts in cooperation with other religious organizations including Catholic Relief Services and Muslim Aid, as well as secular organizations such as the American Red Cross.

During the second half of the 20th century and beginnings of the 21st, the church has responded to various challenges to its doctrine and authority. Challenges have included rising secularization, challenges to the correctness of the translation of the Book of Abraham, and primary documents forged by Mark Hofmann purporting to contradict important aspects of official early church history. The church's positions regarding homosexuality, women, and black people have all been publicly debated during this timeframe.

For over 100 years, the church was a major sponsor of Scouting programs for boys, particularly in the United States. The LDS Church was the largest chartered organization in the Boy Scouts of America, having joined the Boy Scouts of America as its first charter organization in 1913. In 2020, the church ended its relationship with the BSA and began an alternate, religion-centered youth program, which replaced all other youth programs. Prior to leaving the Scouting program, LDS Scouts made up nearly 20 percent of all enrolled Boy Scouts, more than any other church.

Beliefs

Nature of God

LDS Church theology includes the belief in a Godhead composed of God the Father, his son, Jesus Christ, and the Holy Ghost as three separate Persons who share a unity of purpose or will; however, they are viewed as three distinct Beings making one Godhead. This is in contrast with the predominant Christian view, which holds that God is a Trinity of three distinct persons in one essence. The Latter-day Saint conception of the Godhead is similar to what contemporary Christian theologians call social trinitarianism. The beliefs of the church also include the belief that God the Father and his son, Jesus Christ, are separate beings with bodies of flesh and bone, while the Holy Ghost lacks such a physical body.

According to statements by church leaders, God sits at the head of the human family and is married to a Heavenly Mother, who is the mother of human spirits. However, church leaders have also categorically discouraged prayers to her and counseled against "speculation" regarding her.

Jesus Christ
Church members believe in Jesus Christ as the literal Son of God and Messiah, his crucifixion as a conclusion of a sin offering, and subsequent resurrection. However, Latter-day Saints reject the ecumenical creeds and the definition of the Trinity. Jesus is also seen as the elder brother of all who live in this world.

The church teaches that Jesus performed a substitutionary atonement; in contrast with other Christian denominations, the church teaches this atonement began in the garden of Gethsemane and continued it to his crucifixion (rather than the orthodox belief that the crucifixion alone was the physical atonement). The church also teaches that Christ appeared to other peoples in the period of time between his death and resurrection, including spirits of the dead in the spirit world, and his followers in the Americas.

The church also teaches that Jesus is the true founder and leader of the church itself. The physical establishment of the church by Smith in 1830 is seen as simply the reestablishment of the same primitive church that existed under Jesus and his Apostles. Similarly, the church teaches that Jesus leads the church presently by means of continual and direct revelation to its leaders, especially its current president.

Comparison with Nicene Christianity

The LDS Church shares various teachings with other branches of Christianity. These include a belief in the Bible, the divinity of Jesus, and his atonement and resurrection. LDS theology also includes belief in the doctrine of salvation through Jesus alone, restorationism, millennialism, continuationism, conditional substitutionary atonement or penal substitution, and a form of apostolic succession.

Nevertheless, the LDS Church differs from other churches within contemporary Christianity in other ways. Differences between the LDS Church and most of traditional Christianity include disagreement about the nature of God, belief in a theory of human salvation that includes three heavens, a doctrine of exaltation which includes the ability of humans to become gods and goddesses in the afterlife, a belief in continuing revelation and an open scriptural canon, and unique ceremonies performed privately in temples, such as the endowment and sealing ceremonies. A number of major Christian denominations view the LDS Church as standing apart from creedal Christianity. However, church members self-identify as Christians.

The faith itself views other modern Christian faiths as having departed from true Christianity by way of a general apostasy and maintains that it is a restoration of 1st-century Christianity and the only true and authorized Christian church. Church leaders assert it is the only true church and that other churches do not have the authority to act in Jesus' name.

Cosmology and plan of salvation

The church’s cosmology and plan of salvation include the doctrines of a pre-mortal life, an earthly mortal existence, three degrees of heaven and exaltation.

According to these doctrines, every human spirit is a spiritual child of a Heavenly Father and each has the potential to continue to learn, grow, and progress in the eternities, eventually achieving eternal life, which is to become one with God in the same way that Jesus Christ is one with the Father, thus allowing the children of God to become divine beings – that is, gods – themselves. This view on the doctrine of theosis is also referred to as becoming a "joint-heir with Christ". The process by which this is accomplished is called exaltation, a doctrine which includes the reunification of the mortal family after the resurrection and the ability to have spirit children in the afterlife and inherit a portion of God's kingdom. To obtain this state of godhood, the church teaches that one must have faith in Jesus Christ, repent of his or her sins, strive to keep the commandments faithfully, and participate in ordinances.

According to LDS Church theology, men and women may be sealed to one another so that their marital bond continues into the eternities. Children may also be sealed to their biological or adoptive parents to form permanent familial bonds, thus allowing all immediate and extended family relations to endure past death. The most significant LDS ordinances may be performed via proxy in behalf of those who have died, such as baptism for the dead. The church teaches that all will have the opportunity to hear and accept or reject the gospel of Jesus Christ, either in this life or the next.

Within church cosmology, the fall of Adam and Eve is seen positively. The church teaches that it was essential to allow humankind to experience separation from God, to exercise full agency in making decisions for their own happiness.

Restorationism

The LDS Church teaches that, subsequent to the death of Jesus and his original apostles, his church, along with the authority to act in Jesus Christ's name and the church's attendant spiritual gifts, were lost, due to a combination of external persecutions and internal heresies. The restoration—as represented by the church began by Joseph Smith—refers to a return of the authentic priesthood power, spiritual gifts, ordinances, living prophets and revelation of the primitive Church of Christ. This restoration is associated with a number of events which are understood to have been necessary to re-establish the early Christian church found in the New Testament, and to prepare the earth for the Second Coming of Jesus. In particular, Latter-day Saints believe that angels appeared to Joseph Smith and a limited number of his associates, and bestowed various priesthood authorities on them.

Prophetic leadership
The church is led by a president, who is considered a "prophet, seer, and revelator." Within the church, he is referred to as "the Prophet" or the "President of the Church." He is considered the only person who is authorized to receive revelation from God on behalf of the whole world or entire church. As such, the church teaches that he is essentially infallible when speaking on behalf of God – although the exact circumstances when his pronouncements should be considered authoritative are debated within the church. In any case, modern declarations with broad doctrinal implications are often issued by joint statement of the First Presidency; they may be joined by the Quorum of the Twelve Apostles as well.

Normally, the Prophet and two other ordained apostles he chooses as counselors form the First Presidency, the presiding body of the church; twelve other apostles form the Quorum of the Twelve Apostles. When a president dies, his successor is chosen from the remaining apostles, and is invariably the longest-tenured of the group. Following the death of church president Thomas S. Monson on January 2, 2018, senior apostle Russell M. Nelson was announced as president on January 16.

Home and family

The church and its members consider marriage and family highly important, with emphasis placed on large, nuclear families. In 1995, the church's First Presidency and Quorum of the Twelve issued "The Family: A Proclamation to the World", which stresses the importance of the family. The proclamation defined marriage as a union between one man and one woman and stated that the family unit is "central to the Creator's plan for the eternal destiny of His children." The document further says that "gender is an essential characteristic of individual premortal, mortal, and eternal identity and purpose," that the father and mother have differing but equal roles in raising children, and that successful marriages and families, founded upon the teachings of Jesus Christ, can last eternally. The proclamation also promotes specific roles essential to maintaining the strength of the family unit – the roles of a husband and father as the family's breadwinner and spiritual leader and those of a wife and mother as a nurturing caregiver. Both parents are charged with the duties of childrearing.

LDS Church members are encouraged to set aside one evening each week, typically Monday, to spend together in "Family Home Evening." Family Home Evenings typically consist of gathering as a family to study the faith's gospel principles, and other family activities. Daily family prayer is also encouraged.

Sources of doctrine

The theology of the LDS Church consists of a combination of biblical doctrines with modern revelations and other commentary by LDS leaders, particularly Joseph Smith. The most authoritative sources of theology are the faith's canon of four religious texts, called the "standard works". Included in the standard works are the Bible, the Book of Mormon, the Doctrine and Covenants and the Pearl of Great Price.

The Book of Mormon is a foundational sacred book for the church; the terms "Mormon" and "Mormonism" come from the book itself. The LDS Church teaches that the Angel Moroni told Smith about golden plates containing the record, guided him to find them buried in the Hill Cumorah, and provided him the means of translating them from Reformed Egyptian. It claims to give a history of the inhabitants from a now-extinct society living on the American continent and their distinct Judeo-Christian teachings. The Book of Mormon is very important to modern Latter-day Saints, who consider it the world's most perfect text.

The Bible, also part of the church's canon, is believed to be the word of God – subject to an acknowledgment that its translation may be incorrect, or that authoritative sections may have been lost over the centuries. Most often, the church uses the Authorized King James Version. Two extended portions of the Joseph Smith Translation of the Bible have been canonized and are thus considered authoritative. Additionally, over 600 of the more doctrinally significant verses from the translation are included as excerpts in the current LDS Church edition of the Bible. Other revelations from Smith are found in the Doctrine and Covenants, and in the Pearl of Great Price.

Another source of authoritative doctrine is the pronouncements of the current Apostles and members of the First Presidency. The church teaches that the First Presidency and the Quorum of Twelve Apostles are prophets and that their teachings are generally given under inspiration from God through the Holy Spirit.

In addition to doctrine given by the church as a whole, individual members of the church believe that they can also receive personal revelation from God in conducting their lives, and in revealing truth to them, especially about spiritual matters. Generally, this occurs through thoughts and feelings from the Holy Ghost, in response to prayer. Similarly, the church teaches its members may receive individual guidance and counsel from God through
blessings from priesthood holders. In particular, patriarchal blessings are considered special blessings that are received only once in the recipient's life, which are recorded, transcribed, and archived.

Practices

Ordinances

In the church, an ordinance is a sacred rite or ceremony that has spiritual and symbolic meanings, and acts as a means of conveying divine grace. Ordinances are physical acts which signify or symbolize an underlying spiritual act; for some ordinances, the spiritual act is the finalization of a covenant between the ordinance recipient and God. Ordinances are generally performed under priesthood authority.

The ordinance of baptism is believed to bind its participant to Jesus Christ, who saves them in their imperfection if they continually keep their promises to him. Baptism is performed by immersion, and is typically administered to children starting at age eight.

Church members believe that through the ordinances of temple sealing and temple endowment, anyone can be eternally connected with their families beyond this life and can be perfected in Jesus Christ to eventually become like their Heavenly Parents—in essence gods.

Other ordinances performed in the church include confirmation, the sacrament (equivalent to the Eucharist or holy communion), and priesthood ordination.

Word of Wisdom

The LDS Church asks its members to adhere to a dietary code called the Word of Wisdom, in which they abstain from the consumption of alcohol, coffee, tea, tobacco, and illicit or harmful substances. The Word of Wisdom also encourages the consumption of herbs and grains along with the moderate consumption of meat.

When Joseph Smith published the Word of Wisdom in 1833, it was considered only advice; violation did not restrict church membership. During the 1890s, though, church leaders started emphasizing the Word of Wisdom more. In 1921, church president Heber J. Grant made obeying the Word of Wisdom a requirement to engage in worship inside of the faith's temples. From that time, church leadership has emphasized the forbidding of coffee, tea, tobacco, and alcohol, but not the other guidelines concerning meat, grains, and herbs.

Law of chastity

Church members are expected to follow a moral code called the law of chastity, which prohibits adultery, homosexual behavior, and sexual relations before or outside of marriage. As part of the law of chastity, the church strongly opposes pornography, and considers masturbation an immoral act.

Tithing and other donations

Church members are expected to donate one-tenth of their income to support the operations of the church, including construction of temples, meetinghouses, and other buildings, and other church uses. Members are also encouraged to fast (abstain from food and drink for two meals) on the first Sunday of each month for at least two consecutive meals. They donate at least the cost of the two skipped meals as a "fast offering", which the church uses to assist the poor and needy and expand its humanitarian efforts.

Local leadership is not remunerated financially, and is expected to tithe as well. Missionaries, however, are not expected to pay tithing directly as their living expenses are paid from church funds.

Missionary service

All able LDS young men are expected to serve a two-year, full-time proselytizing mission. Missionaries do not choose where they serve or the language in which they will proselytize, and are expected to fund their missions themselves or with the aid of their families. Prospective male missionaries must be at least 18 years old and no older than 25, not yet married, have completed secondary school, and meet certain criteria for physical fitness and spiritual worthiness. Missionary service is not compulsory, nor is it required for young men to retain their church membership.

Unmarried women 19 years and older may also serve as missionaries, generally for a term of 18 months. However, the LDS Church emphasizes that women are not under the same expectation to serve as male members are, and may serve solely as a personal decision. There is no maximum age for missionary service for women.

Retired couples are also encouraged to serve missions, and may serve 6-, 12-, 18-, or 23-month terms. Unlike younger missionaries, these senior missionaries may serve in non-proselytizing capacities such as humanitarian aid workers or family history specialists. Other men and women who desire to serve a mission, but may not be able to perform full-time service in another state or country due to health issues, may serve in a non-proselyting mission. They might assist at Temple Square in Salt Lake City or aid in the seminary system in schools.

All proselyting missionaries are organized geographically into administrative areas called missions. The efforts in each mission are directed by an older adult male mission president. As of July 2020, there were 407 missions of the church.

Sabbath day observance

Church members are expected to set aside Sundays as a day of "rest and worship." Typically, weekly worship meetings occur solely on Sundays. Shopping and recreation are discouraged on Sundays as well.

Worship and meetings

Weekly meetings
Meetings for worship and study are held at meetinghouses, which are typically utilitarian in character. The main focus of Sunday worship is the Sacrament meeting, where the sacrament is passed to church members; sacrament meetings also include prayers, the singing of hymns by the congregation or choir, and impromptu or planned sermons by church laity. Also included in weekly meetings are times for Sunday School, or separate instructional meetings based on age and gender, including the Relief Society for women.

Church congregations are organized geographically. Members are generally expected to attend the congregation with their assigned geographical area; however, some geographical areas also provide separate congregations for young single adults, older single adults, or for speakers of alternate languages. For Sunday services, the church is grouped into either larger congregations known as wards, or smaller congregations known as branches. Regional church organizations, encompassing multiple congregations, include stakes, missions, districts and areas.

The church's Young Men and Young Women organizations meet at the meetinghouse once a week, on a day other than Sunday, where the youth participate in activities.

Temple worship

In LDS theology, a temple is considered to be a holy building, dedicated as a "House of the Lord" and held as more sacred than a typical meetinghouse or chapel. In temples, church members participate in ceremonies that are considered the most sacred in the church, including marriage, and an endowment ceremony that includes a washing and anointing, receiving a temple garment, and making covenants with God. Baptisms for the dead - as well as other temple ordinances on behalf of the dead - are performed in the temples as well.

Temples are considered by church members to be the most sacred structures on earth, and as such, operating temples are not open to the public. Permission to enter is reserved only for church members who pass periodic interviews with ecclesiastical leaders and receive a special recommendation card, called a temple recommend, that they present upon entry. Church members are instructed not to share details about temple ordinances with non-members or even converse about them outside the temple itself. As of November 2022, there are 175 operating temples worldwide.

In order to perform ordinances in temples on behalf of deceased family members, the church emphasizes genealogical research, and encourages its lay members to participate in genealogy.
It operates FamilySearch, the largest genealogical organization in the world.

Conferences
Twice each year, general authorities address the worldwide church through general conference. General conference sessions are translated into as many as 80 languages and are broadcast from the 21,000-seat Conference Center in Salt Lake City. During this conference, church members formally acknowledge, or "sustain", the First Presidency and Quorum of the Twelve Apostles as prophets, seers, and revelators.

Individual stakes also hold formal conferences within their own boundaries biannually; wards hold conferences annually.

Organization and structure

Name and legal entities

The church teaches that it is a continuation of the Church of Christ established in 1830 by Joseph Smith. This original church underwent several name changes during the 1830s, being called the Church of Jesus Christ, the Church of God; in 1834, the name was officially changed to the Church of the Latter Day Saints. In April 1838, the name was officially changed to "The Church of Jesus Christ of Latter Day Saints". After Smith died, Brigham Young and the largest body of Smith's followers incorporated the LDS Church in 1851 by legislation of the State of Deseret under the name "The Church of Jesus Christ of Latter-day Saints", which included a hyphenated "Latter-day" and a British-style lower-case d.

Common informal names for the church include the LDS Church, the Latter-day Saints, and the Mormons. The term Mormon Church is in common use. The church requests that the official name be used when possible or, if necessary, shortened to "the Church", "the Church of Jesus Christ", or "Latter-day Saints". In August 2018, church president Russell M. Nelson asked members of the church and others to cease using the terms "LDS", "Mormon" and "Mormonism" to refer to the church, its membership, or its belief system and instead to call the church by its full and official name. Subsequent to this announcement, the church's premier vocal ensemble, the Mormon Tabernacle Choir, was officially renamed and became the "Tabernacle Choir at Temple Square".  Reaction to the name change policy has been mixed.

The church currently functions as a corporation sole, incorporated in Utah.

Intellectual Reserve is a nonprofit corporation wholly owned by the church, which holds the church's intellectual property, such as copyrights, trademarks, and other media.

Priesthood hierarchy

The LDS Church is organized in a hierarchical priesthood structure administered by its male members. Members of the church-wide leadership are called general authorities. They exercise both ecclesiastical and administrative leadership over the church and direct the efforts of regional leaders down to the local level. General authorities and mission presidents work full-time for the church, and typically receive stipends from church funds or investments. As well as speaking in general conference, general authorities speak to church members in local congregations throughout the world; they also speak to youth and young adults in broadcasts and at the Church Educational System (CES) schools, such as Brigham Young University (BYU). Local congregations are typically led by bishops, who perform similar functions to pastors in the Protestant tradition, or parish priests in the Roman Catholic church.

Each active church member is expected to receive one or more callings, or positions of assigned responsibility within the church. Individual members are expected to neither ask for specific callings, nor decline callings that are extended to them by their leaders. Leadership positions in the church's various congregations are filled through the calling system, and the vast majority of callings are filled on a volunteer basis. Members volunteer general custodial work for local church facilities.

All males who are living the standards of the church are generally considered for the priesthood and are ordained to the priesthood as early as age 11. Ordination occurs by a ceremony where hands are laid on the head of the one ordained. The priesthood is divided into an order for young men aged 11 years and older (called the Aaronic priesthood) and an order for men 18 years of age and older (called the Melchizedek priesthood).

Some church leaders and scholars have spoken of women holding or exercising priesthood power. However, women are not formally ordained to the priesthood, and they do not participate in public functions administered by the priesthood - such as passing the Sacrament, giving priesthood blessings, or holding leadership positions over congregations as a whole. From 2013 to about 2014, the Ordain Women organization actively sought formal priesthood ordination for women.

Programs and organizations

Under the leadership of the priesthood hierarchy are five organizations that fill various roles in the church: Relief Society, the Young Men and Young Women organizations, Primary, and Sunday School. Women serve as presidents and counselors in the presidencies of the Relief Society, Young Women, and Primary, while men serve as presidents and counselors of the Young Men and Sunday School. The church also operates several programs and organizations in the fields of proselytizing, education, and church welfare such as LDS Humanitarian Services. Many of these organizations and programs are coordinated by the Priesthood Correlation Program, which is designed to provide a systematic approach to maintain worldwide consistency, orthodoxy, and control of the church's ordinances, doctrines, organizations, meetings, materials, and other programs and activities.

The church operates CES, which includes BYU, BYU–Idaho, BYU–Hawaii, and Ensign College. The church also operates Institutes of Religion near the campuses of many colleges and universities. For high-school aged youth, the church operates a four-year Seminary program, which provides religious classes for students to supplement their secular education. The church also sponsors a low-interest educational loan program known as the Perpetual Education Fund, which provides educational opportunities to students from developing nations.

The church's welfare system, initiated in 1930 during the Great Depression, provides aid to the poor. Leaders ask members to fast once a month and donate the money they would have spent on those meals to help the needy, in what is called a fast offering. Money from the program is used to operate Bishop's storehouses, which package and store food at low cost. Distribution of funds and food is administered by local bishops. The church also distributes money through its Philanthropies division to disaster victims worldwide.

Other church programs and departments include Family Services, which provides assistance with adoption, marital and family counseling, psychotherapy, and addiction counseling; the LDS Church History Department, which collects church history and records; and the Family History Department, which administers the church's large family history efforts, including FamilySearch, the world's largest family history library and organization. Other facilities owned and operated by the church include Temple Square, the Church Office Building, the Church Administration Building, the Church History Library and the Granite Mountain Records Vault.

Finances

Since 1941, the church has been classified by the IRS as a 501(c)(3) organization and is therefore tax-exempt. Donations are tax-deductible in the United States. The church has not released church-wide financial statements since 1959. In the absence of official statements, people interested in knowing the church's financial status and behavior, including both members of the church and people outside the church, have attempted to estimate or guess.

In 1997, Time magazine called the LDS Church one of the world's wealthiest churches per capita. Its for-profit, non-profit, and educational subsidiary entities are audited by an independent accounting firm. In addition, the church employs an independent audit department that provides its certification at each annual general conference that church contributions are collected and spent in accordance with church policy.

The church receives significant funds from tithes and fast offerings. According to the church, tithing and fast offering money is devoted to ecclesiastical purposes and not used in for-profit ventures. It has been estimated that the LDS Church received $33 billion in donations from its members in 2010, and that during the 2010s its net worth increased by about $15 billion per year. According to estimates by Bloomberg Businessweek, the LDS Church's net worth was $40 billion as of 2012.

The church's assets are held in a variety of holding companies, subsidiary corporations, and for-profit companies including: Bonneville International, KSL, Deseret Book Company, and holding companies for cattle ranches and farms in at least 12 U.S. States, Canada, New Zealand, and Argentina. Also included are banks and insurance companies, hotels and restaurants, real estate development, forestry and mining operations, and transportation and railway companies. Investigative journalism from the Truth & Transparency Foundation in 2022 suggests the church may be the owner of the most valuable real estate portfolio in the United States, with a minimum market value of $15.7 billion. The church has also invested in for-profit business and real estate ventures such as City Creek Center. The Church-owned investment firm Ensign Peak Advisors publicly reports management of approximately $37.8 billion of financial securities, as of 2020.

Culture

Due to the differences in lifestyle promoted by church doctrine and history, members of the church have developed a distinct culture. It is primarily concentrated in the Intermountain West.  

Many of the church's more distinctive practices follow from their adherence to the Word of Wisdom – which includes abstinence from tobacco, alcohol, coffee, and tea – and their observance of Sabbath-day restrictions on recreation and shopping. Common, distinctive cuisine includes funeral potatoes and Jello salad. Cultural taboos exist on piercings and tattoos after church guidance to avoid them; use of the cross as a symbol of worship is uncommon.

Media and arts

LDS-themed media includes cinema, fiction, websites, and graphical art such as photography and paintings. The church owns a chain of bookstores called Deseret Book, which provide a channel through which publications are sold; church leaders have authored books and sold them through the publishing arm of the bookstore. BYU TV, the church-sponsored television station, also airs on several networks. The church also produces several pageants annually depicting various events of the primitive and modern-day church. Its Easter pageant Jesus the Christ has been identified as the "largest annual outdoor Easter pageant in the world". The church encourages entertainment without violence, sexual content, or vulgar language; many church members specifically avoid rated-R movies.

The church's official choir, the Tabernacle Choir at Temple Square, was formed in the mid-19th century and performs in the Salt Lake Tabernacle. They have travelled to more than 28 countries, and are considered one of the most famous choirs in the world. The choir has received a Grammy Award, three Emmy Awards, two Peabody Awards, and the National Medal of Arts.

Notable members of the church in the media and arts include: Donny Osmond, an American singer, dancer, and actor; Orson Scott Card, author of Ender's Game; Stephenie Meyer, author of the Twilight series; and Glenn Beck, a conservative radio host, television producer, and author. Notable productions related to the church, though produced by individuals not affiliated with it, include Murder Among the Mormons, a 2021 Netflix documentary; and The Book of Mormon, a big-budget musical about Mormon missionaries that received nine Tony Awards.

Political involvement

The LDS Church states it generally takes no partisan role in politics, but encourages its members to play an active role as responsible citizens in their communities, including becoming informed about issues and voting. The church maintains that the faith's values can be found among many political parties.

A 2012 Pew Center on Religion and Public Life survey indicates that 74 percent of U.S. members lean towards the Republican Party. Some liberal members say they feel that they have to defend their worthiness due to political differences. Democrats and those who lean Democrat made up 18% of church members surveyed in the 2014 Pew Research Center's Religious Landscape Survey.

The official church stance on staying out of politics does not include if there are instances of what church leaders deem to be moral issues, or issues the church "believes ... directly affect [its] interests." It has previously opposed same-sex marriage in California Prop 8, supported a gay rights bill in Salt Lake City which bans discrimination against homosexual persons in housing and employment, opposed gambling, opposed storage of nuclear waste in Utah, and supported an approach to U.S. immigration policy as outlined in the Utah Compact. It also opposed a ballot initiative legalizing medicinal marijuana in Utah, but supported a possible alternative to it. In 2019 and 2021, the church stated its opposition to the Equality Act, which would prohibit discrimination in the United States on the basis of sexual orientation and gender identity, but supports alternate legislation that it says would protect both LGBTQ rights and religious freedom. In 2022, the church stated its support for the Respect for Marriage Act - which would codify same-sex marriage as legal in the United States - due to the "protections for religious freedom" it includes.

In the 117th United States Congress, there are nine LDS Church members, including all six members of Utah's congressional delegation, all of whom are Republicans. Utah's current governor, Spencer Cox, is also a church member, as are supermajorities in both houses of the Utah State Legislature. Church member and current U.S. Senator Mitt Romney was the Republican Party's nominee in the U.S. 2012 presidential election.

Demographics

The church reports a worldwide membership of 16 million. The church's definition of "membership" includes all persons who were ever baptized, or whose parents were members while the person was under the age of eight (called "members of record"), who have neither been excommunicated nor asked to have their names removed from church records with approximately 8.3 million residing outside the United States, as of December 2011.

According to its statistics, the church is the fourth largest religious body in the United States. Although the church does not publish attendance figures, researchers estimate that attendance at weekly LDS worship services globally is around 4 million. Members living in the U.S. and Canada constitute 46 percent of membership, Latin America 38 percent, and members in the rest of the world 16 percent. The 2012 Pew Forum on Religion & Public Life survey, conducted by Princeton Survey Research Associates International, found that approximately 2 percent of the U.S. adult population self-identified as Mormon.

Membership is concentrated geographically in the Intermountain West, in a specific region sometimes known as the Mormon corridor. Church members and some others from the United States colonized this region in the mid-to-late 1800s, dispossessing several indigenous tribes in the process. 

The church experienced rapid numerical growth in the 20th century, especially in the 1980s and 1990s. In the 21st century, however, church membership growth has slowed. Still, in the last decade, the church has more than doubled in size in Africa; the largest regional increases by raw numbers occurred in the United States, South America, and Africa.

In the United States, church members tend to be more highly educated than the general population. , 54 percent of LDS men and 44 percent of women have post-secondary education; the general American population stands at 37 percent and 28 percent, respectively. The racial and ethnic composition of membership in the United States is one of the least diverse in the country. Church membership is predominantly white; the membership of blacks is significantly lower than  the general U.S. population.

The LDS Church does not release official statistics on church activity, but it is likely that only approximately 40 percent of its recorded membership in the United States and 30 percent worldwide regularly attend weekly Sunday worship services. A statistical analysis of the 2014 Pew Religious Landscape Survey assessed that "about one-third of those with a Latter-day Saint background... left the Church", identifying as disaffiliated. Activity rates vary with age, and disengagement occurs most frequently between age 16 and 25. Young single adults are more likely to become inactive than their married counterparts, and overall, women tend to be more active than men.

Humanitarian services

The LDS Church provides worldwide humanitarian service, and is considered widely known for it. The church's welfare and humanitarian efforts are coordinated by Philanthropies, a church department under the direction of the Presiding Bishopric. Welfare efforts, originally initiated during the Great Depression, provide aid for the poor, financed by donations from church members. Philanthropies is also responsible for philanthropic (that is, not tithing or fast offering) donations to the LDS Church and other affiliated charities, such as the Church History Library, the Church Educational System (and its subsidiary organizations), the Tabernacle Choir at Temple Square and funds for LDS missionaries. Donations are also used to operate bishop's storehouses, which package and store food for the poor at low cost, and provide other local services. In 2016, the church reported that it had spent a total of $1.2 billion on humanitarian aid over the previous 30 years.

Church humanitarian aid includes organizing food security, clean water, mobility, and healthcare initiatives, operating thrift stores, maintaining a service project website, and directly funding or partnering with other organizations. The church reports that the value of all charitable donations in 2021 was $906 million. Independent reporting has found that the Church's  charity organization, LDS Charities, gave a total of $177 million from 2008 to 2020.

The church also distributes money and aid to disaster victims worldwide. In 2005, the church partnered with Catholic Relief Services to provide aid to Niger. In 2010, it partnered with Islamic Relief to help victims of flooding in Pakistan. Latter-day Saint Charities (a branch of the church's welfare department) increased food production during the COVID-19 pandemic and donated healthcare supplies to 16 countries affected by the crisis. The church has donated $4 million to aid refugees fleeing from the 2022 Russian invasion of Ukraine. In 2022, the church gave $32 million to the United Nations World Food Programme, in its largest one-time donation to a humanitarian organization to that point.

Discrimination and persecution

The LDS Church and other churches within Mormonism have been the subject of discrimination and sometimes violent persecution. The most vocal and strident opposition occurred during the 19th century, particularly the forceful expulsion from Missouri and Illinois in the 1830s and 1840s, during the Utah War of the 1850s, and in the second half of the century.

Violent persecution against the LDS Church occurred in the early 1830s in Missouri. Mormons quickly earned long-lasting enmity in the frontier communities, due to discordant cultural attitudes (including opposition to slavery in a slave state) and their practice of voting as a bloc (thus gaining significant political power). This enmity culminated in the Missouri Mormon War and Governor Boggs’ “extermination order.”

Modern-day opposition to the church and Mormonism can broadly be divided into two separate strains of thought: the secular, and the religious. Secular criticism focuses primarily on refuting the church’s truth claims; religious opposition, led mostly by Evangelicals, argues that Mormonism is heretical or diabolical.

In recent years, an increasing number of meetinghouses and other church facilities have been the targets of vandalism or arson. In 2022, the Orem Utah Temple was damaged by arson while under construction.

Criticism and controversy

The LDS Church has been subject to criticism and the subject of controversy since its early years in New York and Pennsylvania.

Modern criticism of the church includes disputed factual claims, allegations of historical revisionism by the church, child sexual abuse, anti-gay teachings, racism, and sexism. Notable 20th-century critics include Jerald and Sandra Tanner and historian Fawn Brodie.

Child sexual abuse

The church has been criticized for a number of alleged abuses perpetrated by local church leadership. In other cases, church leaders have been criticized for allegedly failing to properly report abuse to law enforcement.

Scriptures

In the late 1820s, criticism centered on the claim by Joseph Smith to have been led to a set of gold plates from which the Book of Mormon was reputedly translated.

Mainstream academic scholarship does not conclude the Book of Mormon is of an ancient origin and considers the book to be a 19th-century composition. Scholars have pointed out a number of anachronisms within the text. They argue that no evidence of a reformed Egyptian language has ever been discovered.  Also, general archaeological and genetic evidence has not supported the book's statements about any known indigenous peoples of the Americas.

Since its publication in 1842, the Book of Abraham (currently published as part of the canonical Pearl of Great Price) has also been a major source of controversy. Numerous non-Mormon Egyptologists, beginning in the late 19th century, have disagreed with Joseph Smith's explanations of the book's facsimiles. Translations of the original papyri - by both Mormon and non-Mormon Egyptologists - do not match the text of the Book of Abraham as purportedly translated by Joseph Smith. Indeed, the transliterated text from the recovered papyri and facsimiles published in the Book of Abraham contain no direct references to Abraham. Scholars have also asserted that damaged portions of the papyri have been reconstructed incorrectly by Smith or his associates.

Polygamy

Polygamy (called plural marriage within the church) was practiced by church leaders for more than half of the 19th century, and practiced publicly from 1852 to 1890 by between 20 and 30 percent of Latter-day Saint families. It was instituted privately in the 1830s by founder Joseph Smith and announced publicly in 1852 at the direction of Brigham Young.

For over 60 years, the church and the United States were at odds over the issue: at one point, the Republican platform referenced "the twin relics of barbarism—polygamy and slavery." The church defended the practice as a matter of religious freedom, while the federal government aggressively sought to eradicate it;
in 1862, the United States Congress passed the Morrill Anti-Bigamy Act, which prohibited plural marriage in the territories.

In 1890, church president Wilford Woodruff issued a Manifesto that officially terminated the practice, although it did not dissolve existing plural marriages. Some church members continued to enter into polygamous marriages, but these eventually stopped in 1904 when church president Joseph F. Smith disavowed polygamy before Congress and issued a "Second Manifesto," calling for all plural marriages in the church to cease. Several small fundamentalist groups, seeking to continue the practice, split from the LDS Church, but the mainline church now excommunicates members found practicing polygamy and distances itself from those fundamentalist groups.

Ethnic minorities

Black people

From the administration of Brigham Young until 1978, the church did not allow black people to receive the priesthood - and therefore to hold many leadership positions - or to enter the temple. The priesthood ban was removed when the church leadership claimed they received divine inspiration. Public pressure during the United States' civil rights movement had preceded the priesthood ban being rescinded.

Native American people

Church leadership and publications have previously taught that Native Americans are descendants of Lamanites, a dark-skinned and cursed people from the Book of Mormon. More recently, claims by Mormon researchers and publications generally favor a smaller geographic footprint of Lamanite descendants. Mainstream science and archaeology fail to provide any evidence for the existence of populations of Lamanites. Current church publications state that the exact extent and identity of Lamanite descendants is unknown.

The church ran an Indian Placement Program between the 1950s and the 1990s, wherein indigenous children were adopted by white church members. Criticism resulted during and after the program, including claims of improper assimilation and even abuse. However, many of the involved students and families praised the program, and positive outcomes were reported for many participants.

Jewish people

Some Jewish groups criticized the LDS Church in 1995 after discovering that vicarious baptisms for the dead for victims of the Holocaust had been performed by members of the church. After that criticism, church leaders put a policy in place to stop the practice, with an exception for baptisms specifically requested or approved by victims' relatives. Jewish organizations again criticized the church in 2002, 2004, 2008, and 2012 stating that the church failed to honor the 1995 agreement. The LDS Church says it has put institutional safeguards in place to avoid the submission of the names of Holocaust victims not related to Mormon members, but that the sheer number of names submitted makes policing the database of names impractical.

LGBT people

The church's policies and treatment of sexual minorities and gender minorities have long been the subject of external criticism, as well as internal controversy and disaffection by members. Because of its ban against same-sex sexual activity and same-sex marriage, the LDS church taught for decades that its adherents with same-sex attraction can and should change their attractions through sexual orientation change efforts - and provided therapy and programs with that goal. Current teachings and policies leave homosexual members with the options of: potentially harmful attempts to change their sexual orientation, entering a mixed-orientation opposite-sex marriage, or lifelong celibacy. Some individuals and organizations have argued that church teachings against homosexuality and the treatment of LGBT Mormons by other members and leaders have contributing to their elevated rates of PTSD and depression, as well as suicide and teen homelessness. The church's decades-long, political involvement opposing US same-sex marriage laws has further garnered criticism and protests. Despite the church's history of discrimination, in 2022, the church officially supported the Respect for Marriage Act, which advanced protections for same-sex marriage in the United States.

Criticism of Joseph Smith

In the 1830s, the church was heavily criticized for Smith's handling of a banking failure in Kirtland, Ohio. After the Mormons migrated west, there was fear and suspicion about the LDS Church's political and military power in Missouri, culminating in the 1838 Mormon War and the Mormon Extermination Order (Missouri Executive Order 44) by Governor Lilburn Boggs. In the 1840s, criticism of the church included its theocratic aspirations in Nauvoo, Illinois. Criticism of the practice of plural marriage and other doctrines taught by Smith were published in the Nauvoo Expositor. Opposition led to a series of events culminating in the killing of Smith and his brother while jailed in 1844.

Financial allegations
The church's failure to make its finances public has drawn criticism from commentators who consider its practices too secretive. Critical commentators have asserted that the church uses its corporate structure to "optimize its asset and capital management by moving money and assets between [its] tax-exempt and regular businesses as loans, donations or investments."

In December 2019, a whistleblower alleged the church held over $100 billion in investment funds through its investment management company, Ensign Peak Advisors (EP); that it failed to use the funds for charitable purposes and instead used them in for-profit ventures; and that it misled contributors and the public about the usage and extent of those funds.  In response, the church's First Presidency stated that "the Church complies with all applicable law governing our donations, investments, taxes, and reserves," and that "a portion" of funds received by the church are "methodically safeguarded through wise financial management and the building of a prudent reserve for the future". The church has not directly addressed the fund's size to the public, but third parties have treated the disclosures as legitimate. The disclosure of Ensign Peak has led to criticism that the church's wealth may be excessive. 

The church has been accused of "significant tax evasion" in Australia. According to an investigation by Australian newspapers, The Daily Age and The Sun Herald, the church's corporation LDS Charities Australia was the recipient of nearly $70 million in donations annually (which is tax exempt under Australian law, as opposed to religious donations, which are not) but appeared to actually spend very little of it on charity. According to the investigation, tithing and other religious donations were routed through the corporation to ensure they would be tax exempt. The investigation does not reference any internal church documents to confirm their findings. The church has previously fought to keep its internal financial information out of the public record.

In Canada, a total of more than 1 billion dollars collected through tithing has been transferred tax-free to church universities over a 15-year period. In October 2022, The Sydney Morning Herald announced the results of an investigation it conducted together with multiple other media organizations - that while the church publicly claimed to have donated US$1.35 billion to charity between 2008 and 2020, its private financial reports showed that it actually donated only US$0.177 billion to charity in that period.

In February 2023, the U.S. Securities and Exchange Commission (SEC) issued a  $5 million penalty to the church and its investment company, EP. The SEC alleged that the church concealed its investments and their management in multiple shell companies from 1997 to 2019; the SEC believes these shell companies were approved by senior church leadership to avoid public transparency. The church released a statement  that in 2000 EP "received and relied upon legal counsel regarding how to comply with its reporting obligations while attempting to maintain the privacy of the portfolio." After initial SEC concern in June 2019, the church stated that EP "adjusted its approach and began filing a single aggregated report."

Responses

Mormon apologetics organizations, such as FAIR and the Maxwell Institute, seek to counter criticisms of the church and its leaders. Most of the apologetic work focuses on providing and discussing evidence supporting the claims of Smith and the Book of Mormon. Scholars and authors such as Hugh Nibley, Daniel C. Peterson, and others are well-known apologists within the church.

See also

 Christianity in the United States
 Index of articles related to the Church of Jesus Christ of Latter-day Saints
 List of missions of the Church of Jesus Christ of Latter-day Saints
 List of temples of the Church of Jesus Christ of Latter-day Saints
 Mormon (word)
 Mormonism and Islam
 Mormonism and Judaism
 List of new religious movements

Notes

References

Bibliography

 
.

 

 

 

. See Doctrine and Covenants.

External links

Official church websites
 ChurchofJesusChrist.org – Official church website
 ComeUntoChrist.org – Official church website, with information about basic beliefs. (formerly Mormon.org)

Other sites
 
 

 
1830 establishments in New York (state)
Christian denominations established in the 19th century
Joseph Smith
Religious organizations based in the United States
Religious organizations established in 1830
Religious belief systems founded in the United States